Lahaina is the largest census-designated place (CDP) in West Maui, Maui County, Hawaii, United States and includes the Kaanapali and Kapalua beach resorts. As of the 2020 census, the CDP had a resident population of 12,702. Lahaina encompasses the coast along Hawaii Route 30 from a tunnel at the south end, through Olowalu and to the CDP of Napili-Honokowai to the north. During the tourist season, the population can swell to nearly 40,000 people.

Lahaina's popularity as a tropical getaway has made its real estate some of the most expensive in Hawaii; many houses and condominiums sell for more than $5 million.

History 

In days of native rule Lahaina was the royal capital of Maui Loa,  ("high chief") of the island of Maui, after he ceded the royal seat of Hana to the ruler of Hawaii Island. In Lahaina, the focus of activity is along Front Street, which dates back to the 1820s.  It is lined with stores and restaurants and often packed with tourists. The Banyan Court Park features an exceptionally large banyan tree (Ficus benghalensis) planted by William Owen Smith on April 24, 1873, to commemorate the 50th anniversary of the arrival of Christian missionaries. It is also the site of the reconstructed ruins of Lahaina Fort, originally built in 1832. It is the largest Banyan Tree in the United States.

 was an ancient name of Lahaina. The Hawaiian language name  means "cruel sun", describing the sunny dry climate. Lahaina's historic district averages only  of rain per year, much of which occurs from December to February.

In 1795, before unification of the islands, the town was conquered by Kamehameha the Great. Lahaina was the capital of the Kingdom of Hawaii from 1802 to 1845. King Kamehameha III, son of Kamehameha I, preferred the town to bustling Honolulu. He built a palace complex on a  island Mokuula surrounded by a pond called Moku Hina, said to be home to Kiwahine, a spiritual protector of Maui and the Pi'ilani royal line, near the center of town. 

In 1824, at the chiefs' request, Betsey Stockton started the first mission school open to the common people. It was once an important destination for the 19th-century whaling fleet, whose presence at Lahaina frequently led to conflicts with the Christian missionaries living there. On more than one occasion the conflict was so severe that it led to sailor riots and even the shelling of Lahaina by the British whaler  in 1827. 

In response, Maui Governor Hoapili built the Old Lahaina Fort in 1831 to protect the town from riotous sailors.

Lahaina was the capital of the Kingdom of Hawaii from 1820 to 1845, when the capital was moved back to Honolulu. In the 19th century, Lahaina was the center of the global whaling industry, with many sailing ships anchoring at its waterfront; today pleasure craft make their home there. Lahaina's Front Street has been ranked one of the "Top Ten Greatest Streets" by the American Planning Association.

Geography 

Demographics

Climate
There are many different climates in the different districts of Lahaina.  The historic district is the driest and calmest and hosts the small boat harbor.  Kaanapali is north of a wind line and has double the annual rainfall and frequent breezes. The Kapalua and Napili areas have almost four times the annual rainfall compared to the historic district of Lahaina.

Lahaina has a hot semi-arid climate (Köppen BSh) with warm temperatures year-round.

Attractions 

The southern end of Front Street is home to the largest banyan tree in the United States.

Front Street is a popular attraction with stores and restaurants, as well as many historical sights such as the Bailey Museum, the Lahaina Courthouse, and the Prison.

The West Maui mountains have  valleys visible from the historic district of Lahaina. The valleys are the backdrop for "the 5 o'clock rainbow" that happens almost every day. The "L" in the West Maui mountains stands for Lahainaluna High School and has been there since 1904. In 1831 a fort was built for defense, and the reconstructed remains of its  walls and original cannons can still be seen. Also near the small boat harbor are the historic Pioneer Inn and the Baldwin House museum in the historic district of Lahaina.

Hale Pai, located at Lahainaluna High School, is the site of Hawaii's first printing press, including Hawaii's first paper currency, printed in 1843.

The Plantation Course at Kapalua hosts the PGA Tour's Sentry Tournament of Champions every January.

Carthaginian II was a museum ship moored in the harbor of this former whaling port-of-call. It replaced an earlier replica of a whaler, Carthaginian, which had been converted to film scenes for the 1966 movie Hawaii.

Halloween is a major celebration in Lahaina, with crowds averaging between twenty and thirty thousand people. The evening starts off by closing Front Street to vehicles so the "Keiki Parade" of children in costumes can begin. Eventually, adults in costumes join in. Some refer to Halloween night in Lahaina as the "Mardi Gras of the Pacific". In 2008 the celebration was curtailed due to the objections of a group of cultural advisers who felt Halloween was an affront to Hawaiian culture. In the following years the event was poorly attended, as the street was not closed and no costume contest took place. In 2011, citing economic concerns, the County permitted the event to fully resume.

From November to May, whale-watching excursions are popular with tourists. The peak season for whale watching in Lahaina is January to March.
The humpback whale is by far the most common baleen species found in Hawaiian waters, although there have been rare sightings of fin, minke, Bryde’s, blue, and North Pacific right whales as well. 

Each November, Lahaina hosts the Maui Invitational, one of the top early-season tournaments in college basketball. The event is sponsored by Maui Jim and is held in the Lahaina Civic Center.

The Lahaina Aquatic Center hosts swim meets and water polo.

Lahaina also hosts the finish of the Vic-Maui Yacht Race, which starts in Victoria, British Columbia, Canada. This race started in the 1960s and is held every two years.

The historic district has preserved 60 historic sites within a small area and they are managed by the Lahaina Restoration.

Crime rate 
The chances of becoming a victim of crime in Lahaina is 1 in 385, compared to a higher rate of 1 in 323 in the State of Hawaii as a whole.

Media references 
There have been many movies that were filmed in Lahaina such as Clint Eastwood's Hereafter, in which a monster tsunami ravages Front Street.

 1961 – The Devil at 4 O'Clock starring Spencer Tracy and Frank Sinatra
 1970 – The Hawaiians (film) starring Charlton Heston
 1973 – Papillon starring Steve McQueen and Dustin Hoffman, filmed in Hana. 
 1992 – Baraka, filmed at Haleakala National Park
 1993 – Jurassic Park
 1997 – Turbo: A Power Rangers Movie, filmed at Iao Valley
 2002 – Die Another Day, a 007 film, filmed at Peahi (Jaws). Features clips of famous surfers, Laird Hamilton, Dave Kalama, and Darrick Doerner.
 2003 – The Hulk, filmed on Kahakaloa
 2004 – Riding Giants, filmed at Peahi (Jaws)
 2007 – Pirates of the Caribbean: At World's End, filmed in Pukalani.
 It is also mentioned in the song "The Last Resort" by The Eagles from their 1976 album, Hotel California.

Gallery

See also 

Lahaina Historic District
Lahaina Noon
Living Lahaina

References

External links

Community website
 Maui Guidebook article

 
Census-designated places in Maui County, Hawaii
Capitals of former nations
Beaches of Maui
Populated places on Maui
Whaling in the Hawaiian Kingdom
Populated coastal places in Hawaii